Japan Weather Association  is a Japanese general incorporated foundation that conducts meteorological services. It founded in 1950.

References

External links 

 日本気象協会 - Japan Weather Association
 tenki.jp - Japan Weather Association

Meteorological companies
1950 establishments in Japan
Japanese companies established in 1950
Service companies of Japan